Tamara Natanovna Press (10 May 1937 – 26 April 2021) was a Soviet athlete who dominated the shot put and discus throw in the early 1960s. She won three gold medals and one silver medal at the 1960 and 1964 Olympics and three European titles in 1958–1962. Between 1959 and 1965 she set 11 world records: five in the shot put and six in the discus. She also held 16 national titles, nine in the shot put (1958–66) and seven in the discus (1960–66).

Her younger sister, Irina Press, was also a prominent track athlete, mostly in the sprint events.

Career
Tamara Press was born in Kharkiv, Soviet Union. Her father died fighting in World War II in 1942 and her mother took the daughters to Samarkand, where they started training in athletics. In 1955 Press moved to Leningrad to train under the renowned coach Viktor Alekseyev. The following year she was shortlisted for the Olympic team but was dropped owing to strong domestic competition in the throwing events.

Retirement and gender rumors
Both sisters were accused of being either secretly male or intersex. They retired in 1966, just before sex verification became mandatory on location. In 1942 wartime Soviet evacuation records Tamara Press, then aged 5, is documented as a girl.

In retirement Press worked as an athletics coach and official in Moscow. She wrote several books on sport, social and economical subjects. In 1974 she defended a PhD in pedagogy. She was awarded the Order of Lenin (1960), Order of the Badge of Honour (1964) and Order of Friendship (1997).

Notes

References

External links 
Photo in old age

1937 births
2021 deaths
Soviet female shot putters
Soviet female discus throwers
Ukrainian female shot putters
Ukrainian female discus throwers
Olympic athletes of the Soviet Union
Olympic gold medalists for the Soviet Union
Olympic silver medalists for the Soviet Union
Olympic gold medalists in athletics (track and field)
Olympic silver medalists in athletics (track and field)
Athletes (track and field) at the 1960 Summer Olympics
Athletes (track and field) at the 1964 Summer Olympics
Medalists at the 1960 Summer Olympics
Medalists at the 1964 Summer Olympics
European Athletics Championships medalists
Universiade gold medalists for the Soviet Union
Universiade medalists in athletics (track and field)
Medalists at the 1961 Summer Universiade
Medalists at the 1963 Summer Universiade
Medalists at the 1965 Summer Universiade
World record setters in athletics (track and field)
Japan Championships in Athletics winners
Soviet Athletics Championships winners
Sex verification in sports
Jewish female athletes (track and field)
Ukrainian Jews
Sportspeople from Kharkiv
Recipients of the Order of Lenin
Saint-Petersburg State University of Architecture and Civil Engineering alumni